Matthias Schindler (born 28 March 1982) is a German para-cyclist who represented Germany at the 2020 Summer Paralympics.

Career
Schindler represented Germany in the men's road time trial C3 event at the 2020 Summer Paralympics and won a bronze medal.

References

External links
 
 

Living people
1982 births
Sportspeople from Regensburg
German male cyclists
Paralympic cyclists of Germany
Cyclists at the 2020 Summer Paralympics
Medalists at the 2020 Summer Paralympics
Paralympic medalists in cycling
Paralympic bronze medalists for Germany
Cyclists from Bavaria